The Calopterygidae are a family of damselflies, in the suborder Zygoptera.
They are commonly known as the broad-winged damselflies, demoiselles, or jewelwings. These rather large damselflies have wingspans of 50–80 mm (compared to about 44 mm in the common bluetail damselfly, Ischnura elegans), are often metallic-coloured, and can be differentiated from other damselflies by the broader connection between the wings and the body, as opposed to the abrupt narrowing seen in other damselfly families. The family contains some 150 species.

The Calopterygidae are found on every continent except Antarctica. They live along rivers and streams.

Etymology
The name is derived from Greek kalos meaning beautiful and ptery meaning winged.

Characteristics
The adults have metallic bodies; their wings are broader, with wider bases than other damselflies, and at rest hold their wings parallel to the body, slightly elevated. Some species have conspicuously colored wings; in males, the wings are usually blue, without pterostigmas, in females green or brown. Species are often quite variable in color and patterning, and they are sexually dimorphic. Color intensity may fade with age. The wings are heavily veined, having often 18 or more antenodal veins. The first segment of their antennae is longer than the combined length of the other segments. They have a jerky, skipping form of flight similar to the flight pattern of a butterfly (fluttering, rather than hovering stably like many other damselfly and dragonfly families). At least one species of Calopterygiadae has shown morphological plasticity in wing length due to the closeness of a forest to the river or stream where they live with a further forest correlating to greater wing length. They perch horizontally on twigs near the water's edge.

Calopterygidae nymphs have lateral gills are longer than the median gills. The nymphs have a flattened, pentagonal-shaped head, a long first antennal segment and long legs. They are found among submerged aquatic plants, woody debris and the exposed roots of streamside plants. There is a single generation per year. The time spent in the larval stage is influenced by both biotic factors, such as fat reserves, and abiotic factors, such as temperature, so they have the highest chances of surviving and reproducing.

Behavior

The mating system of most species in this family is resource defense polygyny, where males are often territorial, guarding riverine habitat that is sought after by females for egg deposition. Some males are not territorial. Within a species there may be a territorial and nonterritorial morph, which may be different in coloration.

Some species display courtship behavior, especially displays of wing movement by the male. At least one genus (Hetaerina) displays lekking behavior.

During mating, the male first removes other males' sperm from the female's reproductive tract, then places his own sperm there. The intromittent organ of the male has spines that physically remove rival sperm and also stimulate the female's muscles to contract and expel the sperm. In many species, the male accompanies the female when she searches for a site to lay eggs; in some cases, he even remains attached to her. The guarding of females post-copulation is done so another male does not mate with the female before laying her eggs even though the male may be able to reproduce with other females and in the case of Hetaerina species, the male may lose his territory during the time spent guarding.

Like all Odonata species, the species in this family are carnivorous in both their larval and adult stages. Larvae tend to feed on smaller invertebrates, such as mayflies

Classification

Subfamily Caliphaeinae  – the clearwings:
 Caliphaea 
 Noguchiphaea 

Subfamily Calopteryginae  – the demoiselles:
 Archineura 
 Atrocalopteryx 
 Calopteryx 
 Echo 
 Iridictyon 
 Matrona 
 Mnais 
 Neurobasis 
 Phaon 
 Psolodesmus 
 Sapho 
 Umma 
 Vestalis 

Subfamily Hetaerininae  – the rubyspots and others:
 Hetaerina 
 Mnesarete

References

External links
 

 
Odonata of Oceania
Odonata of Asia
Odonata of Africa
Odonata of North America
Taxa named by Edmond de Sélys Longchamps
Odonata families